The 2019–20 NBA season was the 74th season of the National Basketball Association (NBA). The regular season began on October 22, 2019, and originally was supposed to end on April 15, 2020. However, the season was suspended on March 11 as a result of the COVID-19 pandemic. The 2020 NBA All-Star Game was played on February 16, at the United Center in Chicago, and was won by Team LeBron, 157–155. The playoffs were originally scheduled to begin on April 18, and end with the NBA Finals in June. At the time of the suspension, teams had played between 63 and 67 games.

On June 4, the NBA Board of Governors approved a plan to restart the season on July 30, and the National Basketball Players Association approved this plan the next day. Under the plan, 22 teams played eight additional regular season games to determine playoff seeding, and 16 teams entered a conventional postseason tournament. All of these games took place in the NBA Bubble, an isolation zone specifically created for NBA operations at the ESPN Wide World of Sports Complex at Walt Disney World in Bay Lake, Florida.

On August 26, the season was suspended for a second time by a wildcat strike, to protest the shooting of Jacob Blake and police brutality, during the playoffs. Play resumed three days later on August 29. The Finals ended on October 11, 2020, 355 days after the October 22, 2019, regular season opening day, and 377 days after the first pre-season games on September 30, 2019. This was the longest season in NBA history.

Transactions

Retirement
 On March 1, 2019, Channing Frye announced his retirement from the NBA. Frye played 13 seasons in the NBA, winning one championship with the Cleveland Cavaliers in 2016.
 On April 9, 2019, Dirk Nowitzki announced his retirement from the NBA. Nowitzki played all his 21 seasons with the Dallas Mavericks franchise, winning one championship and Finals MVP with the Mavericks in 2011, and also led them to a Finals appearance in 2006.
 On June 10, 2019, Tony Parker announced his retirement from the NBA. He played 18 seasons in the NBA and was a four-time NBA champion and Finals MVP in 2007 with the San Antonio Spurs.
 On June 28, 2019, Darren Collison announced his retirement from the NBA. He played for five franchises during his 10-year NBA career.
 On August 29, 2019, Zaza Pachulia announced his retirement from the NBA. He played for six franchises during his 16-year career. He won two championships with the Golden State Warriors.
 On September 13, 2019, Shaun Livingston announced his retirement from the NBA. He played for ten franchises during his 15-year NBA career. He won three championships with the Golden State Warriors.
 On October 17, 2019, Luol Deng signed a ceremonial one-day contract with the Chicago Bulls and officially retired as a Bull after playing 15 seasons. He was a two-time All-Star with the Bulls.
 On November 4, 2019, José Calderón announced his retirement from the NBA. He played for seven franchises during his 14-year NBA career.
 On December 28, 2019, Zach Randolph announced his retirement from the NBA, Randolph played for five franchises during his 17-year NBA career. He was a two-time All-Star with the Memphis Grizzlies.
 On February 16, 2020, Marcin Gortat announced his retirement from the NBA. He played for four franchises during his 12-year NBA career.
 On April 14, 2020, Trevor Booker announced his retirement from the NBA. He played for five franchises during his eight-year NBA career.
 On June 25, 2020, Vince Carter announced his retirement from the NBA. Carter played for eight franchises during a record 22-year career in the NBA; he is the only player to play in four different decades and was the last active player to have been drafted and played in the 1990s.

Free agency
Free agency negotiations began on June 30, 2019, at 6 p.m. ET, unlike July 1 from previous seasons. Players officially signed after the July moratorium on July 6 at 12 p.m. ET.

Coaching changes

Off-season
 On April 11, 2019, the Cleveland Cavaliers and Larry Drew parted ways after Drew's contract expired after the 2018–19 season.
 On April 11, 2019, the Memphis Grizzlies fired J. B. Bickerstaff after nearly two seasons.
 On April 11, 2019, the Sacramento Kings fired Dave Joerger after three seasons. The team missed the playoffs for the thirteenth straight year.
 On April 12, 2019, the Los Angeles Lakers and head coach Luke Walton parted ways after three seasons.
 On April 14, 2019, the Sacramento Kings hired Luke Walton as their new head coach.
 On April 22, 2019, the Phoenix Suns fired Igor Kokoškov after one season. The team missed the playoffs for the ninth straight year.
 On May 3, 2019, the Phoenix Suns hired Monty Williams as their new head coach.
 On May 13, 2019, the Cleveland Cavaliers hired John Beilein as their new head coach.
 On May 13, 2019, the Los Angeles Lakers hired Frank Vogel as their new head coach.
 On June 11, 2019, the Memphis Grizzlies hired Taylor Jenkins as their new head coach.

In-season
 On December 6, 2019, the New York Knicks fired head coach David Fizdale after a 4–18 start to the season and named Mike Miller as interim head coach.
 On February 19, 2020, the Cleveland Cavaliers named J. B. Bickerstaff the new head coach of the team after John Beilein resigned from the position.
 On March 7, 2020, the Brooklyn Nets and head coach Kenny Atkinson mutually agreed to part ways. Jacque Vaughn was named interim head coach.

Preseason
The preseason began on September 30 and ended on October 18.

International games
The Indiana Pacers and the Sacramento Kings played two preseason games at the NSCI Dome in Mumbai, India on October 4 and 5, 2019.

The Toronto Raptors and the Houston Rockets played two preseason games at the Saitama Super Arena in Saitama City, Japan on October 8 and 10, 2019.

The Los Angeles Lakers and the Brooklyn Nets played two preseason games in China, in Shanghai on October 10 and in Shenzhen on October 12.

The Los Angeles Clippers and the Dallas Mavericks played one preseason game in Canada, at Rogers Arena in Vancouver on October 17.

Regular season
The 2019–20 schedule was released on August 12, 2019, and the regular season began on October 22, 2019.

On March 11, 2020, the season was suspended due to the COVID-19 pandemic. The reformatted regular season, with 8 more games scheduled for 22 qualified teams going to the NBA Bubble in Orlando, was released on June 26. The regular season resumed play within the bubble on July 30.

Eastern Conference

Western Conference

By conference

Notes
 z – Clinched home court advantage for the entire playoffs/clinched best record 
 c – Clinched home court advantage for the conference playoffs/clinched conference
 y – Clinched division title
 x – Clinched playoff spot
 * – Division winner
 pi - Clinched play-in spot

International games
The Charlotte Hornets and the Milwaukee Bucks played at the AccorHotels Arena in Paris, France on January 24, 2020, marking the first NBA regular season game in France.

On June 7, 2019, the NBA announced that the Dallas Mavericks, Detroit Pistons, Phoenix Suns, and San Antonio Spurs would play at Mexico City Arena in Mexico City, marking the first time that four NBA teams would play in Mexico City in one regular season. The Mavericks and Pistons played on December 12, 2019, and the Spurs and Suns played on December 14, 2019.

Play-in game
 
A play-in game took place in the Western Conference, as the ninth seeded Memphis finished within four games of the eighth seeded Portland. The eighth seed started with a 1–0 lead and needed just one win to advance, while the ninth seed needed to win twice to clinch the final playoff spot. Portland won the play-in game 126–122 to enter the playoffs as the eighth seed.

Playoffs

The 2020 NBA playoffs began on August 17 and ended with the NBA Finals, which began on September 30 and ended on October 11.

Bracket

Suspension of season and restart

On March 11, 2020, the game between the Utah Jazz and Oklahoma City Thunder was abruptly postponed shortly before tipoff after it was discovered that the Jazz's player Rudy Gobert tested positive for COVID-19. That same evening, the game between the New Orleans Pelicans and Sacramento Kings was also postponed last minute once it was discovered that a referee for the game, Courtney Kirkland, had worked a Utah Jazz game just two days prior. Kirkland later tested negative for COVID-19. The NBA then suspended the remainder of the 2019–20 season "until further notice" following the completion of games already underway. This was the first time a regular season had been interrupted since the 2011 NBA lockout. The following day, Gobert's teammate Donovan Mitchell also tested positive. On March 14, Detroit Pistons forward Christian Wood became the third NBA player to test positive for the virus, and the first outside of the Jazz. On March 17, four Brooklyn Nets players, including superstar Kevin Durant, tested positive for the virus. On March 19, two players for the Los Angeles Lakers, as well as Marcus Smart of the Boston Celtics, tested positive for COVID-19. All players recovered and were cleared by local health officials.

On May 23, it was announced that the NBA were in negotiations with The Walt Disney Company about the possibility to finish the season at Walt Disney World's ESPN Wide World of Sports Complex in Orlando. On May 29, NBA Commissioner Adam Silver and the league office informed Board of Governors that July 31 was the target date for a season return.

On June 4, the NBA Board of Governors approved a plan to restart the season on July 31 in Orlando. Under this plan, 13 Western Conference teams and nine Eastern Conference teams, all clubs within six games of a playoff spot, would play eight regular season "seeding" games. Play-in games for the eighth seed in each conference would then be held if the ninth seed finishes the regular season within four games of the eighth seed. This proposal was then approved by members of the National Basketball Players Association on June 5.

Players strike

On August 26, 2020, the Milwaukee Bucks chose not to play in Game 5 of the playoff series against the Orlando Magic to protest the police shooting of Jacob Blake. The NBA and the National Basketball Player's Association announced that, in light of the Milwaukee Bucks striking for their game, the following games of the day would be postponed. The Toronto Raptors had also discussed striking for their second-round playoff series with the Boston Celtics in frustration with a lack of social or legislative change after the murder of George Floyd and as a result of Blake's shooting before the Bucks' strike a few days later.

Medical protocol for season restart

On June 16, 2020, the NBA released a medical protocol to be used during the season restart in the NBA Bubble at Walt Disney World to ensure the health and safety of players, coaches, officials, and staff. This included regular testing for COVID-19 prior to and throughout the season restart, wearing a face covering or mask, and social distancing to prevent an outbreak of COVID-19 from occurring. Players and coaches who were deemed "high-risk individuals" by their team, or players who had already suffered season-ending injuries prior to season suspension, were not permitted to play and also did not lose any salary. Any player who was medically cleared could also decline to participate, but as a result lost their corresponding paychecks.

Phase 1 of the plan ran from June 16 to 22, consisting of players traveling back to the home cities of their respective teams. In Phase 2 from June 23 to June 30, COVID-19 tests began being administered to players every other day. In Phase 3 from July 1 to July 11, mandatory individual workouts were conducted at team facilities, but group workouts were prohibited.

Phase 4 ran from July 7 to July 21, consisting of the teams traveling to Disney World and conducting practices. Any player who tested positive in the previous phases could not travel until he was medically cleared to do so. Once teams arrive in Orlando, players and staff were isolated in their rooms, requiring to pass two Polymerase chain reaction (PCR) tests 24 hours apart before being let out of this quarantine. They were still regularly tested for COVID-19 afterwards. A player who tested positive would be isolated and re-tested in case of a false positive; if COVID-19 was definitely confirmed, he would be quarantined for at least 14 days to recover.

Players and staff were not permitted into another's room, nor were they be able to socialize with players on other teams staying at a different hotel building. They had access to food and recreational activities within their hotel's bubble, but they had to wear masks indoors except when eating. Anybody who left the bubble without prior approval had to be quarantined for at least 10 days.

During Phase 5 from July 22 to 29, teams played three scrimmages against the other teams staying at the same hotel. During Phase 6, when the regular season seeding games and playoffs were under way and teams began to be eliminated from contention, players and staff on those clubs had to pass one final COVID-19 test before they could leave Disney World.

The NBA also set up an anonymous hotline for players to report protocol violations while in the bubble.

Statistics

Individual statistic leaders

Individual game highs

Team statistic leaders

Awards

Yearly awards
While the statistics from the seeding games were counted towards players' regular season totals, the NBA ruled that its end-of-season awards were only based on games through March 11 and excluded the seeding games. Finalist for the major awards were announced during the seeding games. Due to the pandemic, the NBA Awards show held the prior three years was cancelled, and award winners were instead announced on TNT during their coverage of the 2020 playoffs.

All-NBA First Team:
 F Giannis Antetokounmpo, Milwaukee Bucks
 F LeBron James, Los Angeles Lakers
 C Anthony Davis, Los Angeles Lakers
 G Luka Dončić, Dallas Mavericks
 G James Harden, Houston Rockets

All-NBA Second Team:
 F Kawhi Leonard, Los Angeles Clippers
 F Pascal Siakam, Toronto Raptors
 C Nikola Jokić, Denver Nuggets
 G Chris Paul, Oklahoma City Thunder
 G Damian Lillard, Portland Trail Blazers

All-NBA Third Team:
 F Jayson Tatum, Boston Celtics
 F Jimmy Butler, Miami Heat
 C Rudy Gobert, Utah Jazz
 G Ben Simmons, Philadelphia 76ers
 G Russell Westbrook, Houston Rockets

NBA All-Defensive First Team:
 F Giannis Antetokounmpo, Milwaukee Bucks
 F Anthony Davis, Los Angeles Lakers
 C Rudy Gobert, Utah Jazz
 G Ben Simmons, Philadelphia 76ers
 G Marcus Smart, Boston Celtics

NBA All-Defensive Second Team:
 F Bam Adebayo, Miami Heat
 F Kawhi Leonard, Los Angeles Clippers
 C Brook Lopez, Milwaukee Bucks
 G Eric Bledsoe, Milwaukee Bucks
 G Patrick Beverley, Los Angeles Clippers

NBA All-Rookie First Team:
 Ja Morant, Memphis Grizzlies 
 Kendrick Nunn, Miami Heat 
 Brandon Clarke, Memphis Grizzlies
 Zion Williamson, New Orleans Pelicans
 Eric Paschall, Golden State Warriors

NBA All-Rookie Second Team:
 Tyler Herro, Miami Heat 
 Terence Davis, Toronto Raptors
 Coby White, Chicago Bulls
 P. J. Washington, Charlotte Hornets
 Rui Hachimura, Washington Wizards

Players of the Week
The following players were named the Eastern and Western Conference Players of the Week.

Players of the Month
The following players were named the Eastern and Western Conference Players of the Month.

Rookies of the Month
The following players were named the Eastern and Western Conference Rookies of the Month.

Coaches of the Month
The following coaches were named the Eastern and Western Conference Coaches of the Month.

Seeding games
Awards for seeding games play were also announced, with Damian Lillard named Player of the Seeding Games after averaging 37.6 points per game.

Arenas
 This was the Golden State Warriors' first season at the new Chase Center in San Francisco after playing at Oracle Arena in Oakland from 1971 to 2019. The Warriors played their first game there in a preseason game against the Los Angeles Lakers on October 5, 2019. They played their first regular season game there against the Los Angeles Clippers on October 24, 2019.
 The Cleveland Cavaliers' home arena, formerly known as Quicken Loans Arena, was renamed Rocket Mortgage FieldHouse on April 9, 2019.

Media
This was the fourth year of the current nine-year contracts with ABC, ESPN, TNT and NBA TV.

Under an agreement with the U.S. Department of Justice regarding Disney's acquisition of 21st Century Fox, the Fox Sports Regional Networks were required to be sold off to third parties by June 18, 2019. Fox also invoked a clause to give Yankee Global Enterprises the rights to buy their stake back in the YES Network, which aired the local broadcasts to the NBA's Brooklyn Nets. Including YES, the Fox Sports Regional Networks held the local TV rights to a combined total of 44 NHL, NBA, and MLB teams. On March 8, YES was sold to a consortium including Yankee Global Enterprises, Amazon, and Sinclair Broadcast Group for $3.5 billion. Then on May 3, Sinclair and Entertainment Studios agreed to purchase the rest of the Fox Sports Regional Networks. The networks continued to temporarily use the Fox Sports name under a transitional license agreement while Sinclair explored re-branding options.

Notable occurrences

 On October 24, 2019, Vince Carter of the Atlanta Hawks became the first player in NBA history to play 22 seasons. Carter officially checked in the game at 6:52 in the first quarter against the Detroit Pistons.
 On November 3, 2019, Luka Dončić of the Dallas Mavericks became the youngest player to record consecutive 25-point triple-doubles.
 On November 19, 2019, LeBron James of the Los Angeles Lakers became the first player in NBA history to record a triple-double against all 30 NBA teams.
 On November 25, 2019, Carmelo Anthony of the Portland Trail Blazers passed Alex English for 18th on the NBA all-time scoring list.
 On November 27, 2019, LeBron James became the fourth player in NBA history to reach 33,000 career points.
 On December 8, 2019, Luka Dončić surpassed the record for the most consecutive games with at least 20 points, 5 rebounds and 5 assists since the ABA-NBA merger in 1976. Michael Jordan previously held the record, recording 18 consecutive games with at least 20–5–5 between March 13, 1989, and April 4, 1989.
 On December 10, 2019, Vince Carter became the fifth player in NBA history to play at least 1,500 games.
 On December 28, 2019, Jrue Holiday of the New Orleans Pelicans, in addition to Justin Holiday and Aaron Holiday of the Indiana Pacers, became the first three brothers to play in the same NBA game.
 On December 29, 2019, LeBron James became the first player in NBA history to record at least 30,000 points, 9,000 rebounds and 9,000 assists.
 On January 1, 2020, NBA Commissioner Emeritus David Stern died at the age of 77, due to a brain hemorrhage sustained a few weeks prior. For the remainder of the season, all thirty teams wore a black stripe of fabric on the left side of their jerseys in memory of Stern.
 On January 4, 2020, Vince Carter became the only player in NBA history to have played in four different decades.
 On January 13, 2020, Shai Gilgeous-Alexander of the Oklahoma City Thunder became the youngest player in NBA history to record a 20-rebound triple-double at 21 years and 185 days old.
 On January 15, 2020, Chandler Parsons of the Atlanta Hawks was hit by a drunk driver, suffering potentially career-ending injuries.
 On January 17, 2020, Carmelo Anthony of the Portland Trail Blazers became the 18th player in NBA history to reach 26,000 points.
 On January 20, 2020, Russell Westbrook of the Houston Rockets became the second player to record a triple-double against all 30 NBA teams.
 On January 22, 2020, Vince Carter moved past Alex English for 19th on the NBA all-time scoring list.
 On January 25, 2020, LeBron James moved past Kobe Bryant for 3rd on the NBA all-time scoring list.
 On January 26, 2020, a day after being passed by LeBron James for 3rd on the NBA's all-time scoring list, Kobe Bryant and his daughter Gianna died in a helicopter crash in Calabasas, California. During the first minute of each game for this day, players paid tribute by dribbling through the 24-second shot clock violation and the 8-second backcourt violation, referencing the two numbers Bryant wore during his career. In addition to this, the 2020 NBA All-Star Game was played with jersey numbers 24 and 2, the latter to pay tribute to Gianna.
 On January 27, the NBA announced that they would postpone the January 28 game between the Los Angeles Lakers and Los Angeles Clippers at Staples Center out of respect to Bryant. The game was later originally rescheduled for April 9, but was eventually played as the first game of the NBA restart on July 30 following the suspension of play due to the coronavirus pandemic.
 On January 29, 2020, Carmelo Anthony moved past Kevin Garnett for 17th on the NBA all-time scoring list.
 On January 31, 2020, Vince Carter moved up to third place in the NBA all-time games played list with 1,523 passing Dirk Nowitzki in the process.
 On February 23, 2020, the Milwaukee Bucks clinched the earliest playoff berth with their 137–134 win over the Washington Wizards.
On March 11, 2020, the league suspended the season indefinitely after Utah Jazz center Rudy Gobert tested positive for COVID-19, just hours after the WHO declared the disease a pandemic on the same day. Gobert's positive test causes a massive ripple effect, causing a shutdown of the vast majority of the sports world within five days. Vince Carter played in what became his final game, hitting a three-pointer as his final shot in a 136–131 overtime loss to the New York Knicks.
On June 4, the NBA Board of Governors approved 29–1 (with the lone dissenter being the Portland Trail Blazers) resuming the 2019–20 season in Orlando, Florida at Walt Disney World, after prior consideration of Las Vegas and Houston as potential spots.
On June 16, 2020, the NBA released a medical protocol to be used during the season restart in the bubble to ensure the health and safety of players, coaches, officials, and staff.
On June 25, 2020, Vince Carter officially announced his retirement after 22 seasons and four separate decades in the NBA. He is the only player to accomplish both these feats.
On July 30, 2020, the regular season resumed in the NBA bubble.
On August 8, 2020, Luka Dončić recorded his 17th triple double of the season, clinching his spot as the youngest player to ever lead the NBA in triple doubles in a season.
 On August 10, 2020, Carmelo Anthony moved past John Havlicek and Paul Pierce respectively for 16th and 15th on the NBA all-time scoring list
On August 13, 2020, the San Antonio Spurs were eliminated from playoff contention, ending an NBA record-tying 22-year streak.
On August 17, 2020, Donovan Mitchell scored 57 points, the 3rd highest in NBA single-game playoff history, against the Denver Nuggets in game 1 of their playoff series.
On August 23, 2020, Luka Dončić's performance in Game 4 of the Dallas Mavericks playoff series against the Los Angeles Clippers, including 43 points, 17 rebounds, 13 assists, and a game-winning buzzer beater, broke a number of records. He became the youngest player to hit a game-winning buzzer beater in the playoffs, one of only three players to make 40+ points, 15+ rebounds, and 10+ assists in a playoff game, one of only five players to make 40+ points including a buzzer beater in a playoff game, first Dallas Maverick to have a triple double in the playoffs, among others.
On August 23, 2020, Donovan Mitchell scored 51 points and Jamal Murray scored 50 points in a playoff game between the Utah Jazz and the Denver Nuggets, the first time in NBA history that two players scored 50 points in a playoff game.
On August 26, 2020, the Milwaukee Bucks decided to boycott Game 5 of their playoff series against the Orlando Magic in order to protest the Shooting of Jacob Blake a few days prior. Similar decisions by the Oklahoma City Thunder, Houston Rockets, Portland Trail Blazers, and Los Angeles Lakers came shortly after.
On September 15, 2020, the Denver Nuggets defeated the Los Angeles Clippers in the Western Conference semifinals after initially trailing in the series 3–1. This marked the first time that a team overcame consecutive 3–1 series deficits in a single playoff run, as the Nuggets had previously overcome a 3–1 series deficit to win their first round series against the Utah Jazz.
On October 11, 2020, Talen Horton-Tucker became the second youngest NBA player to win an NBA championship after the Los Angeles Lakers beat the Miami Heat 106–93 to win the 2020 NBA Finals.

See also
 COVID-19 pandemic in Canada 
 COVID-19 pandemic in the United States
 Impact of the COVID-19 pandemic on basketball

References

 
NBA
2019–20 in Canadian basketball
NBA season